Gregory David Massialas (born May 20, 1956) is an American foil fencer and fencing coach.

Career
A reserve for the 1976 Summer Olympics in Montreal, he was set to make his Olympic début at the Moscow Games in 1980, but did not compete due to the 66-team boycott of the games. He was one of 461 athletes to receive a Congressional Gold Medal the same year. He competed at the 1984 and 1988 Summer Olympics.

He is the founder and head coach of the Massialas Foundation (MTEAM), a fencing club in San Francisco. Since 2012 he is the national coach of the United States senior foil team, which includes his own son Alexander. He brought the club to a No.1 world ranking, with each of its four members ranking individually in the Top 10 and Miles Chamley-Watson winning the 2013 World Fencing Championships. Massialas' daughter Sabrina, now a senior, is also a high-level foil fencer.

See also
List of USFA Division I National Champions

References

External links
 
 the Massialas Foundation official website

1956 births
Living people
American male foil fencers
American fencing coaches
American people of Greek descent
Olympic fencers of the United States
Fencers at the 1984 Summer Olympics
Fencers at the 1988 Summer Olympics
Cornell University alumni
San Jose State University alumni
Pan American Games medalists in fencing
Pan American Games gold medalists for the United States
Pan American Games silver medalists for the United States
Pan American Games bronze medalists for the United States
Congressional Gold Medal recipients
Fencers at the 1979 Pan American Games
Fencers at the 1983 Pan American Games
Fencers at the 1987 Pan American Games